An ice cream bar is a frozen dessert on a stick or a candy bar that has ice cream in it. The coating is usually a thin layer of chocolate used to prevent the melting and dripping of ice cream. This is also known in the UK as a Choc ice.
The ice cream bar is distinct from the popsicle, which does not contain any ice cream.

History
Originally called "I-Scream-Bar", Ice cream bar, the Edy's Pie (formerly Eskimo Pie) chocolate bar was invented in Iowa by a pharmacy owner named Chris Nelson, who was inspired by a boy named Douglas Ressenden who could not decide between candy and ice cream. The patent was awarded in 1922, but invalidated in 1928.
One of the earliest advertisements for Eskimo Pies appeared in the November 3, 1921 issue of the Iowa City Press-Citizen.

According to the Good Humor ice cream company, confectioner Harry Burt invented ice cream on a stick in 1920, and was granted a patent in 1923.

References

Ice cream
Skewered foods